DZRT (102.3 FM) Radyo Tandikan is a radio station owned and operated by Puerto Princesa Broadcasting Corporation. Its studios and transmitter are located at Brgy. San Miguel, Puerto Princesa.

References

External links
Radyo Tandikan FB Page

Radio stations in Puerto Princesa